Loving the Alien is a BBC Books original novel written by Mike Tucker & Robert Perry and based on the long-running British science fiction television series Doctor Who. It features the Seventh Doctor and Ace.

Trivia 
 There is an alternative cover which features a different newspaper, called the London Inquisitor, providing the same exact headlines.

2003 British novels
2003 science fiction novels
Past Doctor Adventures
Seventh Doctor novels
British science fiction novels
Novels by Mike Tucker
Novels by Robert Perry